Ralph Osborn (1780 – December 27, 1835) was the state auditor of Ohio who served as defendant in the Supreme Court case Osborn v. Bank of the United States.

Ralph Osborn was born in Waterbury, Connecticut, in 1780.  After completing his legal education, he moved to Franklin, Ohio, in 1806, where he practiced law.  After two or three years, he accepted appointment as the first prosecuting attorney of Delaware County, Ohio. He was later elected Clerk of the House in the Ohio legislature, where he served five consecutive sessions, until he was chosen Auditor of the state in 1815, where he served eighteen consecutive years.  In 1833, he was chosen to represent the counties of Franklin and Pickaway in the Ohio State Senate.  After this, he moved to Columbus, Ohio, where he died in December, 1833, at age 56.

References

Ohio state senators
State Auditors of Ohio
1780 births
1835 deaths
19th-century American politicians
People from Franklin, Ohio